There have been a number of warships in the Royal Navy that have borne the name HMS Theseus, from a wooden frigate to a light fleet carrier. The name comes from Theseus, a king of ancient Athens.

 was a 74-gun third-rate ship-of-the-line, launched in 1786. She took part in the Battle of the Nile and the Battle of the Basque Roads in 1809. She was broken up at Chatham in 1814.
She was involved in World War I and scrapped in 1921.
 was a  light fleet carrier that was built in 1944 and was involved in the Korean War and the Suez Crisis. She was scrapped in 1962.

Royal Navy ship names